The EOS C100 is a digital cinema camera made by Canon, announced on August 29, 2012. It was the third camera from the Canon Cinema EOS line to be released, and is the budget camera in the range, being less expensive than both the EOS C300 and EOS C500, going on sale at a recommended price of $7,999. However, unlike the other models, it only shoots in Full HD.

The camera has an EF lens mount, making it compatible with EF, EF-S and EOS EF Cinema lenses.

Specifications
Canon Super 35mm CMOS Sensor
AVCHD Codec
Three Built-In ND Filters
Push Auto Iris/One-Shot AF
Canon Log Gamma
Canon Wide Dynamic Range (DR) Gamma
Fully compatible with all Canon EF, EF-S and EF Cinema Lenses
Dual SD Card Slots
29 Custom Picture Settings
Waveform Monitor/Edge Monitor Focus Assist
HDMI Output With Time Code
Built-In Microphone
Twin XLR Connectors in Handle
Compatibility with Third-Party Accessories
Price approx: $6,000 USD

References

External links 

Canon EOS cameras
Digital movie cameras